Group A of the 2017 FIFA Confederations Cup took place from 17 to 24 June 2017. It consisted of Russia, New Zealand, Portugal, and Mexico. The top two teams, Portugal and Mexico, advanced to the semi-finals.

Teams

Notes

Standings

In the semi-finals:
 The winners of Group A, Portugal, advanced to play the runners-up of Group B, Chile.
 The runners-up of Group A, Mexico, advanced to play the winners of Group B, Germany.

Matches
All times Moscow Time (UTC+3).

Russia vs New Zealand

Portugal vs Mexico

Russia vs Portugal

Mexico vs New Zealand

Mexico vs Russia

New Zealand vs Portugal

References

External links
 Official site
 Official Documents and Match Documents

2017 FIFA Confederations Cup